Candles in the Rain is singer Melanie's third album. Released in 1970, the album produced Melanie's first Top Ten single in North America, "Lay Down (Candles in the Rain)", which was inspired by the crowd's reaction to her performance at Woodstock. The cover of the Rolling Stones' 1967 song "Ruby Tuesday" reached the Top Ten in the United Kingdom.

Track listing
All songs written by Melanie Safka except where noted.
"Candles in the Rain" 1:42
"Lay Down (Candles in the Rain)" (accompanied by the Edwin Hawkins Singers) 3:49
"Carolina in My Mind" (James Taylor) 3:37
"Citiest People" 3:32
"What Have They Done to My Song Ma" (fr) 4:02
"Alexander Beetle" (Safka, A.A. Milne) 2:35
"The Good Guys" 3:08
"Lovin' Baby Girl" 4:20
"Ruby Tuesday" (Mick Jagger, Keith Richards) 4:31
"Leftover Wine" 6:06

Some versions of the album substituted "Close to It All" for "Alexander Beetle", some versions have neither song.

On the original 1970 UK release by Buddah Records (2318009), "Lay Down" is given a timing of 3:49 on both label and sleeve notes as is quoted above. On this album, the track is in fact 7:44 minutes long (from direct timing), but was 3:49 on her Very Best of album.

Personnel
Melanie - guitars, vocals
Alan Parker - guitars
Alan Hawkshaw - keyboards, organ
Edwin Hawkins - piano on "Lay Down (Candles in the Rain)"
Harold McNair - fiddle, flute
Herbie Flowers - bass
Barry Morgan - drums
Rico Reyes - congas, percussion on "Lay Down (Candles in the Rain)"
John Abbott - arrangement on "Lay Down (Candles in the Rain)"; conductor on "What Have They Done to My Song Ma"
Lee Holdridge - string arrangements on "Citiest People" and "Ruby Tuesday"

Charts

Singles

Certifications

References

1970 albums
Buddah Records albums
Melanie (singer) albums
Albums arranged by Lee Holdridge